Evans Peak is a peak to the Northwest of Alouette Lake in Golden Ears Provincial Park, British Columbia.

The peak is named for a father and son, Leslie and John Evans, who vanished in the valley between Edge Peak and Blanshard Peak in the spring of 1966. An extensive search failed to find them and are presumed dead.

References

External links
Live Trails: Evans Peak
Outdoor Vancouver: Evans Peak Trail Guide

Garibaldi Ranges
One-thousanders of British Columbia